Craig Wolff is an American journalist and author and a former sports, feature, and news writer for The New York Times. He was a journalism professor at the Columbia University Graduate School of Journalism. He is also a former senior enterprise editor and writer at The Star-Ledger of Newark, N.J.

While reporting for The New York Times, Wolff was part of the team that won the Pulitzer Prize for coverage of the 1993 World Trade Center bombing. He also covered the story of Tawana Brawley, which he and four of his colleagues turned into  Outrage: The Story Behind the Tawana Brawley Hoax.

He shared in a second Pulitzer Prize in 2017 as an editor for an investigative project examining an NYPD enforcement policy targeting people of color and minority-owned businesses; presented jointly to ProPublica and the New York Daily News.

In 2003, he co-wrote My Heart Will Cross This Ocean: My Story, My Son, Amadou with Kadiatou Diallo, the mother of police brutality victim Amadou Diallo.  It won a 2004 Christopher Award for "work that raises the human spirit."

Beginning in 2001 Wolff has worked as an outside educator for Duke Corporate Education and the Fuqua School of Business, designing and delivering workshops and seminars for global companies, focusing on Storytelling, Cross-cultural Understanding, Relationship Building and The Power of The Question. He is the executive director of Verso Leadership, a corporate education company.

Books
Tennis Superstars: The Men
Outrage: The Story Behind the Tawana Brawley Hoax
My Heart Will Cross This Ocean: My Story, My Son, Amadou

American male journalists
American non-fiction writers
Columbia University faculty
Columbia University Graduate School of Journalism faculty
New York University faculty
Living people
Year of birth missing (living people)